The Lewis River is a tributary of the Heaphy River in New Zealand's Kahurangi National Park. The Lewis River is located in the Buller District. It was named for C. Lewis, one of the contractors who built the Heaphy Track in 1886. The Lewis River flows into the Heaphy River at Lewis Hut. After the river was encroaching the hut, it was removed and replaced nearby by Lewis Shelter. Land Information New Zealand lists the name of the river as "official", i.e. the name is confirmed by the New Zealand Geographic Board.

The Heaphy Track used to cross the Lewis River via a swing bridge near Lewis Hut. This swing bridge was washed away in July 2012. The track was rerouted and from 30 November 2012, it crossed the Heaphy River instead.

See also
List of rivers of New Zealand

Footnotes

References

Rivers of the West Coast, New Zealand
Kahurangi National Park
Rivers of New Zealand